Balmalcolm is a small village in the Kettle parish of Fife, Scotland.

History 
The village first appeared on maps in the mid-eighteenth century and its naming was likely inspired by the name Ballingall, the name of the family which once owned the land on which it lies.

Balmalcolm was the centre of some controversy in the late 1990s when a high level of nitrates were found in the local borehole, which was attributed to the intensive farming of the local area with green vegetables. The area was the first part of Scotland to be designated a Nitrate Vulnerable Zone, and nine farms were required to follow an action programme in regards to their nitrate usage as a result.

Economy 
Surrounded by farms, vegetable packing business Kettle Produce chose Balmalcolm Farm as its headquarters and was founded by two farming families in 1985 after a partnership dating back to 1976.

Farm shop, cafe, and children's play experience Muddy Boots is a popular local attraction in Balmalcolm. Set on a farm owned by the same family for three generations, the business has its roots in the 1950s but has expanded substantially since then, especially in recent years.

References

External links

Kettle Community Council website
Kettle & District community website 

Villages in Fife